The North Wing Solairus is an American ultralight trike that was designed and produced by North Wing Design of Chelan, Washington, introduced about 2015. Now out of production, when it was available it was supplied complete and ready-to-fly.

By February 2018 the aircraft was no longer offered for sale on the company website, although a trike wing with the same name was still in production.

Design and development

The aircraft design features a strut-braced topless hang glider-style high-wing, weight-shift controls, a single-seat open cockpit with a cockpit fairing, tricycle landing gear with wheel fairings and a single engine in pusher configuration.

The aircraft wing is made from bolted-together aluminum tubing, with its double surface wing covered in Dacron sailcloth. The trike carriage is of composite materials and is an aerodynamically faired design. Its  span wing is supported by a single tube-type kingpost and uses an "A" frame weight-shift control bar. The powerplant is a single-cylinder, air-cooled, two-stroke  Polini Thor 100,  Polini Thor 200 engine or the  Bailey 200 V4.

Specifications (Solairus)

References

Solairus
2010s United States sport aircraft
2010s United States ultralight aircraft
Single-engined pusher aircraft
Ultralight trikes